Mieczyno  is a village in the administrative district of Gmina Staroźreby, within Płock County, Masovian Voivodeship, in east-central Poland.

The village has a population of 130.

References

Mieczyno